Saltovo-Mayaki or Saltovo-Majaki is the name given by archaeologists to the early medieval culture of the Pontic steppe region roughly between the Don and the Dnieper Rivers, flourishing roughly between the years of 700 and 950. The culture's type sites are Mayatskoye (aka Mayaki) near the Don and Verkhnii Saltov by the Donets.

History
Saltovo-Mayaki influence was strong in the area of the Volyntsevo culture to the northwest of the main Saltovo-Mayaki territory. There is no consensus as to what ethnicity to assign to this culture, if any at all.

Characteristics
The Saltovo-Mayaki material culture was "fairly uniform" across the various tribes.

Ethnicity
Their culture was a melting pot of Onogur, Khazar, Pecheneg, Magyar, Alan, and Slavic influences.

Genetics
A genetic study published in Nature in May 2018 examined three males of the Saltovo-Mayaki culture buried in Belgorod Oblast, Russia between ca. 700 AD and 900 AD. The sample of Y-DNA extracted belonged to haplogroup R1. The three samples of mtDNA extracted belonged to the haplogroups I, J1b4 and U7a4.

References

Sources

 

Nomadic groups in Eurasia
Medieval Ukraine
Early Middle Ages
Archaeology of Ukraine
Archaeology of Russia
Medieval Russia
Archaeological cultures of Eastern Europe
Iranian nomads